Mós may refer to the following places in Portugal:

 Mós (Bragança), a civil parish in the municipality of Bragança
 Mós (Torre de Moncorvo), a civil parish in the municipality of Torre de Moncorvo 
 Mós (Vila Nova de Foz Côa), a civil parish in the municipality of Vila Nova de Foz Côa
 Mós (Vila Verde), a civil parish in the municipality of Vila Verde